is a formerly tolled road in Ōita Prefecture. It is owned and operated by the Ōita Prefecture Road Corporation. The route is signed E97 under Ministry of Land, Infrastructure, Transport and Tourism's  "2016 Proposal for Realization of Expressway Numbering."

Route description
The Ōita Airport Road begins at a signaled intersection with Japan National Route 213 just to the east of central Hiji. From there it briefly travels north to meet its spur route, a route that links it to the Hiji Bypass. When the routes merge, they turn to the northeast, traveling out of Hiji and in to Kitsuki. The road curves more to the east in Kitsuki and then enters the southern part of Kunisaki. It ends in Kunisaki upon meeting Route 213 once again.

History
The Ōita Airport Road opened on 25 November 1991. A spur route of the toll road, connecting it to the Hiji Bypass, was opened on 30 March 2002. Tolls were removed from the road on 1 December 2010. Many sections of the road have been widened from two lanes to four since its opening.

Junction list
The entire expressway is in Ōita Prefecture. 

|colspan="8" style="text-align: center;"|Through to

Spur to Hiji Bypass

|colspan="8" style="text-align: center;"|Through to 

|colspan="8" style="text-align: center;"|Through to

See also

References

Toll roads in Japan
Roads in Ōita Prefecture
1991 establishments in Japan